The Daily Bread Food Bank (DBFB) is a non-denominational Canadian charity organisation that strives to end hunger in urban communities. The organisation is based in Toronto, Ontario, and feeds thousands of low-income people a year. They also provide valuable resources to the same demographic in order to find them financial assistance and support when needed. The Daily Bread Food Bank is the largest food bank in Canada and was founded in 1983.

80% of donations come from big companies, while the remaining 20% comes from the general public. The food bank works mostly on public donations, and donations from food companies, which are especially solicited around Christmas, Easter, and Thanksgiving.

Events
Every year, Daily Bread is the beneficiary of hundreds of events and drives throughout the city organized by thousands of volunteers.

HoHoTO
HoHoTO, called "the party that twitter built", was one of the largest third-party community events in support of Daily Bread Food Bank. From 2008 to 2017, it was organized by Toronto's technology and media community as a party fundraiser and held each mid-December at the Virgin Mobile Mod Club. The event raised more than $250,000 for the Daily Bread in its first five years, as well as four tonnes of food. HoHoTO has been cited as an example of social action by Twitter co-founder, Biz Stone, BoingBoing co-founder Cory Doctorow, Queen Rania of Jordan, and was referenced as a case study in a business book.

See also

 List of food banks

References

External links
 Official Daily Bread Food Bank website
 Torontopedia.ca (now on localwiki):  Daily Bread Food Bank
  Youtube.com: Daily Bread Food Bank

Food banks in Canada
Organizations based in Toronto
Religious organizations based in Canada
Organizations established in 1984
1984 establishments in Ontario
Christian relief organizations